Amphibians of North America includes:

Northern America
List of amphibians of Northern America
List of amphibians of the United States
List of amphibians of Canada
List of amphibians of Bermuda

Middle America
List of amphibians of Mexico

Central America and the Caribbean
List of amphibians of Cuba
List of amphibians of Belize
List of amphibians of Panama
List of amphibians of Antigua and Barbuda
List of amphibians of Barbados
List of amphibians of Grenada
List of amphibians of Dominica
List of amphibians of Costa Rica
List of amphibians of El Salvador
List of amphibians of Guatemala
List of amphibians of Honduras
List of amphibians of Puerto Rico
List of amphibians of Hispaniola
List of amphibians of Haiti
List of amphibians of the Dominican Republic
List of amphibians of Nicaragua
List of amphibians of Saint Kitts and Nevis
List of amphibians of Saint Vincent and the Grenadines
List of amphibians of Saint Lucia
List of amphibians of Sint Maarten
List of amphibians of Sint Eustatius
List of amphibians of Montserrat
List of amphibians of Martinique
List of amphibians of Guadeloupe
List of amphibians of the Collectivity of Saint Martin
List of amphibians of Saint Barthélemy
List of amphibians of the Cayman Islands
List of amphibians of Anguilla

See also
 List of reptiles of North America

Amphibians of North America